The Bennett Building, also known as the Ervin Building is an historic building located in downtown Council Bluffs, Iowa, United States.  The previous building to occupy this property was a Woolworth's that was destroyed in a fire in 1922.  The Bennett Building Corporation was formed in 1923 to build an office building that was designed to attract medical professionals.  The seven-story, brick, Early Commercial structure was designed by local architectural firm Jensen and Larson, and the Omaha firm of McDonald and McDonald served as the supervising architects.  E. A. Wickham and Company of Council Bluffs was the contractor.  

It follows a rectangular plan in the basement and first floor, and from the second to the seventh floor it follows an "L" shaped plan. The exterior features a tripartite division. The first floor is a limestone base that houses storefronts and the entrance lobby for the offices above. Floors two through six are composed of brick with large, regularly spaced windows. They contained professional offices, with many of them occupied by physicians and dentists. Many of Council Bluffs' women doctors had their practices here. The top floor is a modest brick and limestone crown that also housed offices. The Bennett Building has been converted into an apartment building. It was listed on the National Register of Historic Places in 2001.

References

Office buildings completed in 1924
Apartment buildings in Iowa
Commercial architecture in Iowa
Buildings and structures in Council Bluffs, Iowa
Office buildings on the National Register of Historic Places in Iowa
National Register of Historic Places in Pottawattamie County, Iowa
Chicago school architecture in Iowa